The Czech Year (Czech title: Špalíček), also called A Treasury of Fairy-Tales, is a 1947 stop-motion-animated puppet feature film from Czechoslovakia. It was the first feature film directed by Jiří Trnka, and it proceeded to win several international awards and make his name famous in the animation world.

Plot
The traditional customs and tales of a Czech village are depicted in six separate sequences: "Shrovetide", "Spring", "Legend About St. Prokop", "The Fair", "The Feast" and "Bethlehem".

Awards
1947—Venice (Italy): International Prize for Animated Picture
1948—Venice (Italy): Biennial Medal
1949—Paris (France): First Prize in Category

See also
List of animated feature films
List of package films
List of stop-motion films
Špalíček (ballet), a ballet by Bohuslav Martinů

References

External links

Kratky animated film database
A Treasury of Fairy-tales at the Kratky animated film database
Spalicek at the Big Cartoon Database

1947 animated films
1947 films
Czechoslovak animated films
1940s Czech-language films
Films based on fairy tales
Films directed by Jiří Trnka
Animated anthology films
1940s stop-motion animated films
Czech animated films
Films set in the Czech Republic